Oleg Ţulea (born 31 March 1980) is a Moldovan politician who served as the foreign minister of the Republic of Moldova in 2020. He previously served as member of the Parliament of Moldova (2005–2009). 1998, Oleg Tsulya joined the Democratic Party of Moldova (PDM) and was elected chairman of the DPM youth organization "Democratic Youth". On 3 February 2016, he was appointed as the Ambassador to Hungary. On 29 June 2016, he was appointed concurrently as ambassador to Bosnia and Herzegovina, Croatia and Slovenia. He was also the deputy sports minister from 2009 to 2011. He is fluent in Romanian, Russian and English, and speaks French at an intermediate level.

References

External links 
  List of candidates to the position of deputy in the Parliament of the Republic of Moldova for parliamentary elections of 6 March, 2005 of the Electoral Bloc “Moldova Democrata”
 List of deputies elected in the March 6 parliamentary elections
 Lista deputaţilor aleşi la 6 martie 2005 în Parlamentul Republicii Moldova

1980 births
Living people
People from Căușeni District
Moldovan MPs 2005–2009
Electoral Bloc Democratic Moldova MPs
Foreign ministers of Moldova